Kuhjerd (also Romanized as Kūhjerd) is a village in Paskhan Rural District, in the Central District of Darab County, Fars Province, Iran. At the 2006 census, its population was 564, in 141 families.

References 

Populated places in Darab County